The Precipice is a science fiction novel by Hugo Award winner Ben Bova. This novel is part of the Grand Tour series of novels. It is the first book in The Asteroid Wars series.  It was first published in 2001. The title "The Precipice" refers to the "greenhouse cliff", or the ultimate collapse of Earth's biosphere, preceded by the steady encroachment of climate change.

Plot synopsis
The greenhouse effect is threatening the earth.  Two rival industrialists, Dan Randolph and  Martin Humphries believe that the key to earth's survival is to mine the asteroid belt and move earth's heavy industry to space.

Millionaire Dan Randolf is going bankrupt, since his aerospace company, Astro Corp, is out of work due to the "greenhouse cliff" putting Earth at a higher priority than space. Cold-hearted multi-billionaire Martin Humphries shows Randolph a fully laid-out plan to reach the Asteroid Belt and mine it for its abundant metals. Randolph immediately takes up the idea, putting his entire life savings into the plan. Humphries donates much of the funds from his own pocket, planning to use that leverage later, after Randolph has put in all of his own work, to destroy Randolph, take over Astro Corp, and have a monopoly on all metals arriving from the Asteroids Belt.

While Dan Randolph wants to distribute the Asteroids' resources fairly at a very modest price to aid in the restoration of Earth's climate system, Martin Humphries intends to take over the company and use the monopoly to his own financial gain.

Characters
 Dan Randolph, protagonist
 Martin Humphries, antagonist
 George Ambrose, Dan Randolph's personal bodyguard.
 Pancho Lane, Leading astronaut, hired by Dan Randolf
 Amanda Cunningham, astronaut, also the love-object of Martin Humphries
 Lars Fuchs, asteroid specialist and love-mate of Amanda Cunningham
 Lyall Duncan, inventor of the spracecraft fusion-propulsion system
 Kris Cardenas, Nobel-laureate, solar system's top expert on nanotechnology

Reception 

According to Library Journal, The Precipice "highlights current environmental issues and scientific speculation while simultaneously telling a tale of heroes and villains that should appeal to most fans of hard sf.

Publication history 
2001, UK Hodder & Stoughton ISBN Hodder & Stoughton Ltd, Pub Date 1 Feb 2001, Hardcover
2001, USA, Tor Books , Pub Date 26 October 2001, Hardcover
2001, UK, New English Library , Pub Date 16 Aug 2001, Paperback
2002, USA, Tor Books , Pub Date  15 December 2002, Paperback

Notes 

2001 American novels
Novels by Ben Bova
2001 science fiction novels
American science fiction novels
Tor Books books
Fiction about main-belt asteroids
Hodder & Stoughton books